Kasuganomichi Station is the name of two train stations in Kobe, Japan:

 Kasuganomichi Station (Hankyu)
 Kasuganomichi Station (Hanshin)